Dalbit Petroleum is a privately owned energy company headquartered in Nairobi, Kenya. The company specialises in the distribution of petroleum products, with a focus on the East African region. It is a subsidiary of Janus Continental Group.

History 
Dalbit Petroleum was founded in 2002 by Humphrey Kariuki. The company's name "Dalbit" is derived from the Somali language, meaning "wealthy" or "prosperous".

In the early years of the company, Dalbit focused on providing fuel to the mining industry in Kenya. As the company grew, it expanded its operations and began supplying fuel to the aviation, transportation, and construction industries.

Dalbit is currently one of the largest fuel distributors in East Africa, with a presence in Kenya, Uganda, Tanzania, South Sudan, and the Democratic Republic of Congo. In 2018, President Uhuru Kenyatta awarded Dalbit with the "leading large oil importer" trophy.

In February 2019, the Kenyan Directorate of Criminal Investigations (DCI) raided the offices of another company owned by founder Humphrey Kariuki. This raid resulted in a manhunt for Kariuki, and there were allegations of tax evasion to the sum of $30 million, as well as the smuggling of substandard ethanol products into Kenya.

Operations 
The company operates a network of storage facilities and depots in strategic locations across the region, allowing it to efficiently distribute petroleum products to its customers. Its core business is the distribution of petroleum products, including gasoline, diesel, jet fuel, and lubricants.

Dalbit also provides logistics and storage services to its customers, including trucking and pipeline transportation, storage tank leasing, and fuel quality testing. The company has implemented various corporate social responsibility initiatives, including supporting education and healthcare programs, and providing disaster relief and community development projects. Since 2013, Dalbit (as main contractor) and BSL infrastructure (as sub-contractor) have built 7 multi-million litre fuel depots in Zambia.

References 

Oil companies of Kenya
Companies based in Nairobi
2002 establishments in Kenya